Shashavaglava is the debut studio album by Australian rock band Spiderbait. "Shashavaglava" means "crazyhead" in Serbo-Croatian. The final seven tracks are incorporated from an earlier EP, P'tang Yang Kipper Bang Uh!.

It was originally released in June 1993 on Au Go Go. In 1995, when Spiderbait signed to Polygram, the album was reissued on the new label.

Track listing 

Note: The original Au Go Go release has incorrect track marks. The song "Shashavaglava" is split over two tracks, while "Invisible Man" and "K.C.R." appear as a single track. This causes the track numbers of the intervening tracks to be offset by one. The problem was corrected in later pressings. It also appears like this in the iTunes release.

Release history

References 

1993 debut albums
Spiderbait albums